Juan Bonilla, O. Carm. (19 April 1636 – April 1696) was a Roman Catholic prelate who served as Bishop of Ariano (1689–1696).

Biography
Juan Bonilla was born in Valladolid, Spain on 19 April 1636 and ordained a priest in the Order of Carmelites.
On 28 February 1689, he was appointed during the papacy of Pope Innocent XI as Bishop of Ariano.
On 6 March 1689, he was consecrated bishop by Galeazzo Marescotti, Cardinal-Priest of Santi Quirico e Giulitta, with Alberto Mugiasca, Bishop of Alessandria della Paglia, and Alberto Sebastiano Botti, Bishop of Albenga, serving as co-consecrators. 
He served as Bishop of Ariano until his death April 1696.

See also 
Catholic Church in Italy

References

External links and additional sources
 (for Chronology of Bishops) 
 (for Chronology of Bishops) 

17th-century Italian Roman Catholic bishops
Bishops appointed by Pope Innocent XI
Bishops of Ariano
1636 births
1696 deaths
People from Valladolid
Carmelite bishops